Iurie Livandovschi, also spelled Levandovschi (born 17 February 1988) is a Moldavian footballer who plays as forward.

References

External links

Profile at Sport1
Profile at uefa.com
Profile at zimbru.md
Profile at meczyki.pl

1988 births
Moldovan footballers
Living people
FC Zimbru Chișinău players
Association football forwards